Roman Arkadyevich Abramovich (born 24 October 1966) is a Russian oligarch and politician.  He is the former owner of Chelsea, a Premier League football club in London, England, and is the primary owner of the private investment company Millhouse LLC. He has Russian, Israeli and Portuguese citizenship.

He was formerly Governor of Chukotka Autonomous Okrug from 2000 to 2008. According to Forbes, Abramovich's net worth was 14.5 billion in 2021, making him the second-richest person in Israel, the eleventh-richest in Russia and the richest person in Portugal. Abramovich enriched himself in the years following the collapse of the Soviet Union in the 1990s, obtaining Russian state-owned assets at prices far below market value in Russia's controversial loans-for-shares privatisation program. Abramovich is considered to have a good relationship with Russian president Vladimir Putin, an allegation Abramovich denied.

Early life
Roman Arkadyevich Abramovich was born on 24 October 1966 in Saratov, Russian SFSR, Soviet Union (present-day Saratov, Russia). His family was of Jewish descent and died when he was young. His mother, Irina (1939−1967), was a music teacher who died when Abramovich was one years old. His father, Aaron Abramovich Leibovich (1937−1969), worked in the economic council of the Komi ASSR, and passed away when Roman was three. Roman's maternal grandparents were Vasily Mikhailenko and Faina Borisovna Grutman, both born in Ukraine. It was to Saratov in the early days of World War II that Roman's maternal grandmother fled from Ukraine. Irina was then three years old. Roman's paternal grandparents, Nachman Leibovich and Toybe (Tatyana) Stepanovna Abramovich, were Belarusian Jews. They lived in Belarus and, after the revolution, moved to Tauragė, Lithuania, with the Lithuanian spelling of the family name being Abramavičius.

In 1940, the Soviet Union (USSR) annexed Lithuania. Just before the Nazi German invasion of the USSR, the Soviets "cleared the anti-Soviet, criminal and socially dangerous element" with whole families being sent to Siberia. Abramovich's grandparents were separated when deported. The father, mother and children – Leib, Abram and Aron (Arkady) – were in different cars. Many of the deportees died in the camps. Among them was the grandfather of Abramovich. Nachman Leibovich died in 1942 in the NKVD camp in the settlement of Resheti, Krasnoyarsk Territory.

Having lost both parents before the age of 4, Abramovich was raised by relatives and spent much of his youth in the Komi Republic in northern Russia. Abramovich is the Chairman of the Federation of Jewish Communities of Russia, and a trustee of the Moscow Jewish Museum. Abramovich decided to establish a forest of some 25,000 new and rehabilitated trees, in memory of Lithuania's Jews who were murdered in the Holocaust, plus a virtual memorial and tribute to Lithuanian Jewry (Seed a Memory) enabling people from all over the world to commemorate their ancestors' personal stories by naming a tree and including their name in the memorial.

Career

Business career

Abramovich entered the business world during his army service. He first worked as a street-trader, and then as a mechanic at a local factory. Abramovich attended the Gubkin Institute of Oil and Gas in Moscow, then traded commodities for the Swiss trading firm Runicom.

In 1988, as perestroika created opportunities for privatization in the Soviet Union, Abramovich gained a chance to legitimise his old business. He and his first wife, Olga, set up a company making dolls. Within a few years his wealth spread from oil conglomerates to pig farms. He has traded in timber, sugar, food stuffs and other products. In 1992, he was arrested and sent to prison in a case of theft of government property.

Friendship with Boris Berezovsky
According to two different sources, Abramovich first met Berezovsky either at a meeting with the Russian businessmen in 1993 or in the summer of 1995.

Berezovsky and Abramovich registered an offshore company, Runicom Ltd., with five subsidiaries. Abramovich headed the Moscow affiliate of the Swiss firm, Runicom S.A. In August 1995, Boris Yeltsin decreed the creation of Sibneft, of which Abramovich and Berezovsky were thought to be top executives.

Acquisition of Sibneft, loans-for-shares, and aluminium wars

In 1995, Abramovich and Berezovsky acquired a controlling interest in the large oil company Sibneft in a rigged auction. The deal took place within the controversial loans-for-shares program and each partner paid US$100 million for half of the company, above the stake's stock market value of US$150 million at the time, and rapidly turned it up into billions. The fast-rising value of the company led many observers, in hindsight, to suggest that the real cost of the company should have been in the billions of dollars (it was worth US$2.7 billion at that time). Abramovich later admitted in court that he paid billions of dollars of bribes to government officials and gangsters to acquire and protect his assets. As of 2000, Sibneft annually produced US$3 billion worth of oil.

The Times claimed that he was assisted by Badri Patarkatsishvili in the acquisition of Sibneft. After Sibneft, Abramovich's next target was the aluminium industry. After privatisation, the "aluminium wars" led to murders of smelting plant managers, metals traders and journalists as groups battled for control of the industry. Abramovich was initially hesitant to enter into the aluminium business, claiming that "every three days someone was murdered in that business". Abramovich sold Sibneft to the Russian government for $13 billion in 2005.

Relationship with Boris Berezovsky and Badri Patarkatsishvili
In 2011, Abramovich's longtime business partner filed a civil suit, Berezovsky v Abramovich, in the High Court of Justice in London. He accused Abramovich of blackmail, breach of trust and breach of contract. The suit sought over £3 billion in damages.

On 31 August 2012, the High Court dismissed the lawsuit. The High Court judge stated that because of the nature of the evidence, the case hinged on whether to believe Berezovsky or Abramovich's evidence. The judge found Berezovsky to be "an unimpressive, and inherently unreliable witness, who regarded truth as a transitory, flexible concept, which could be moulded to suit his current purposes", whereas Abramovich was seen as "a truthful, and on the whole, reliable witness".

Evidence in the case
In 2011, a transcript emerged of a taped conversation that took place between Abramovich and Berezovsky at Le Bourget airport in December 2000. Badri Patarkatsishvili, a close acquaintance of Berezovsky, was also present and secretly had the conversation recorded. During the discussion, Berezovsky spoke of how they should "legalise" their aluminium business, and later claimed in court that he was an undisclosed shareholder in the aluminium assets and that "legalisation" in this case meant to make his ownership "official". In response, Abramovich states in the transcript that they cannot legalise because the other party in the 50–50 joint venture (Rusal) would need to do the same, in a supposed reference to his business partner Oleg Deripaska. Besides Deripaska, references are made to several other players in the aluminium industry at the time that would have had to "legalise" their stake. Abramovich's lawyers later claimed that "legalisation" meant structuring protection payments to Berezovsky to ensure they complied with Western antimoney-laundering regulations.

The Times also observed:

According to court-papers submitted by Abramovich, Abramovich mentions in the court-papers:

Investments in technology
In 2015, Abramovich invested and led a $30 million round of funding with businessman OD Kobo Chairman of PIR Equities. Other partners include several well-known people from the music industry, among them David Guetta, Nicki Minaj, Tiësto, Avicii, will.i.am, Benny Andersson, Dave Holmes (manager of Coldplay) and others.

Also StoreDot, founded by Doron Myersdorf, where Abramovich has invested over $30 million.

Football

Chelsea Football Club

In June 2003, Abramovich became the owner of the companies that control Chelsea in West London. The previous owner of the club was Ken Bates, who later bought rivals Leeds United. Chelsea immediately embarked on an ambitious programme of commercial development, with the aim of making it a worldwide brand at par with footballing dynasties such as Manchester United and Real Madrid, and also announced plans to build a new state-of-the-art training complex in Cobham, Surrey.

Since the takeover, the club has won 18 major trophies – the UEFA Champions League twice, the UEFA Europa League twice, the UEFA Supercup twice, the Premier League five times, the FA Cup five times (with 2010 providing the club's first ever league and FA Cup double), and the League Cup three times, making Chelsea the most successful English trophy winning team during Abramovich's ownership, equal with Manchester United (who have also won 16 major trophies in the same time span). His tenure has also been marked by rapid turnover in managers. Detractors have used the term "Chelski" to refer to the new Chelsea under Abramovich, to highlight the modern phenomena of billionaires buying football clubs and "purchasing trophies", by using their personal wealth to snap up marquee players at will, distorting the transfer market, citing the acquisition of Andriy Shevchenko for a then-British record transfer fee of around £30 million (€35.3 million).

In the year ending June 2005, Chelsea posted record losses of £140 million (€165 million) and the club was not expected to record a trading profit before 2010, although this decreased to reported losses of £80.2 million (€94.3 million) in the year ending June 2006. In a December 2006 interview, Abramovich stated that he expected Chelsea's transfer spending to fall in the years to come. UEFA responded to the precarious profit/loss landscape of clubs, some owned by billionaires, but others simply financial juggernauts like Real Madrid, with Financial Fair Play regulations.

Chelsea finished their first season after the takeover in second place in the Premier League, up from fourth the previous year. They also reached the semi-finals of the Champions League, which was eventually won by the surprise contender Porto, managed by José Mourinho. For Abramovich's second season at Stamford Bridge, Mourinho was recruited as the new manager, replacing the incumbent Claudio Ranieri. Chelsea ended the 2004–05 season as league champions for the first time in 50 years and only the second time in their history. Also high were Abramovich's spending regarding purchases of Portuguese football players. According to record newspaper accounts, he spent 165.1 million euros in Portugal: 90.9 with Benfica players, and 74.2 with FC Porto players.

Abramovich is present at nearly every Chelsea game and shows visible emotion during matches, a sign taken by supporters to indicate a genuine love for the sport, and usually visits the players in the dressing room following each match. This stopped for a time in early 2007, when press reports appeared of a feud between Abramovich and manager Mourinho regarding the performance of certain players such as Andriy Shevchenko. On 1 July 2013, Chelsea celebrated ten years under Abramovich's ownership. Before the first game of the 2013–14 season against Hull City on 18 August 2013, Abramovich thanked Chelsea supporters for ten years of support in a short message on the front cover of the match programme, saying, "We have had a great decade together and the club could not have achieved it all without you. Thanks for your support and here's to many more years of success."

In March 2017, Chelsea announced it had received approval for a revamped £500m stadium at Stamford Bridge with a capacity of up to 60,000. On 15 July 2018, the renewal of Abramovich's British visa by the Home Office, and his subsequent withdrawal of the application, in May 2018 Chelsea halted plans to build a £500m stadium in south-west London due to the "unfavourable investment climate" and the lack of assurances about Abramovich's immigration status. Abramovich was set to invest hundreds of millions of pounds for the construction of the stadium. Abramovich has been accused of purchasing Chelsea at the behest of Vladimir Putin, but he has denied the claim. Putin's People, a book by journalist Catherine Belton, a former Financial Times Moscow correspondent, formerly made such an assertion, but after libel action by Abramovich against Belton and the book's British publisher HarperCollins, the claims were agreed in December 2021 to be stated as having no factual basis in future editions.

In 2021, Abramovich was criticized for trying to enter Chelsea into the newly announced European Super League. The competition was widely scrutinized for encouraging greediness among the richer, larger football clubs, which would have undermined the significance of existing football competitions; however, just two days later, Abramovich pulled the club out of the new competition, with other English clubs following suit, causing the league to suspend operations. In 2022, it was reported that Abramovich was owed $2 billion from Chelsea F.C. According to Forbes, Abramovich's loan was insurance in case the British government considered sanctioning him due to his close relationship with the Putin regime in Russia. On 26 February 2022, during the Russo-Ukrainian War, Abramovich handed over "stewardship and care" of Chelsea FC to the Chelsea Charitable Foundation.

Abramovich released an official statement on 2 March 2022 confirming that he was selling the club due to the ongoing situation in Ukraine. Although the UK government froze Abramovich's assets in the United Kingdom on 10 March due to his "close ties with [the] Kremlin", it was made clear that the Chelsea club would be allowed to operate in activities which were football related. On 12 March, the Premier League disqualified Abramovich as a director of Chelsea Football Club.

On 7 May 2022, Chelsea announced that a new ownership group led by Todd Boehly and Clearlake Capital had agreed on the terms to acquire the club.

CSKA Moscow
In March 2004, Sibneft agreed to a three-year sponsorship deal worth €41.3 million (US$58 million) with the Russian team CSKA Moscow. Although the company explained that the decision was made at management level, some viewed the deal as an attempt by Abramovich to counter accusations of being "unpatriotic" which were made at the time of the Chelsea purchase. UEFA rules prevent one person owning more than one team participating in UEFA competitions, so Abramovich has no equity interest in CSKA. A lawyer, Alexandre Garese, is one of his partners in CSKA.

Following an investigation, Abramovich was cleared by UEFA of having a conflict of interest. Nevertheless, he was named "most influential person in Russian football" in the Russian magazine Pro Sport at the end of June 2004. In May 2005, CSKA won the UEFA Cup, becoming the first Russian club ever to win a major European football competition. In October 2005, however, Abramovich sold his interest in Sibneft and the company's new owner Gazprom, which sponsors Zenit Saint Petersburg, cancelled the sponsorship deal.

Russian national team

Abramovich also played a large role in bringing Guus Hiddink to Russia to coach the Russia national football team. Piet de Visser, a former head scout of Hiddink's club PSV Eindhoven and now a personal assistant to Abramovich at Chelsea, recommended Hiddink to the Chelsea owner.

National Academy of Football
In addition to his involvement in professional football, Abramovich sponsors a foundation in Russia called the National Academy of Football. The organization sponsors youth sports programs throughout the country and has constructed more than fifty football pitches in various cities and towns. It also funds training programs for coaches, prints instruction materials, renovates sports facilities and takes top coaches and students on trips to visit professional football clubs in England, the Netherlands and Spain. In 2006 the Academy of Football took over the administration of the Konoplyov football academy at Primorsky, near Togliatti, Samara Oblast, where over 1,000 youths are in residence, following the death at 38 of its founder, Yuri Konoplev.

Political career

In 1999, Abramovich was elected to the State Duma as the representative for the Chukotka Autonomous Okrug, an impoverished region in the Russian Far East. He started the charity Pole of Hope to help the people of Chukotka, especially children, and in December 2000, was elected governor of Chukotka, replacing Aleksandr Nazarov.

Abramovich was the governor of Chukotka from 2000 to 2008. It is believed that he invested over US$1.3 billion (€925 million) in the region. During his tenure, living standards improved, schools and housing were restored and new investors were drawn to the region. Abramovich was awarded the Order of Honour for his "huge contribution to the economic development of the autonomous district [of Chukotka]", by a decree signed by the President of Russia.

In early July 2008, it was announced that President Dmitry Medvedev had accepted Abramovich's request to resign as governor of Chukotka, although his various charitable activities in the region would continue. In the period 2000–2006 the average salaries in Chukotka increased from about US$165 (€117/£100) per month in 2000 to US$826 (€588/£500) per month in 2006.

Informal Ukraine diplomacy

The day after the 2022 Russian invasion of Ukraine, Abramovich was contacted by Ukrainian magnates and asked to function as informal envoy to Putin.

Abramovich played a key role in the release of Aiden Aslin and other foreign prisoners of war from Russian captivity.

Relationship with Russian leaders

Boris Yeltsin
By 1996, at the age of 30, Abramovich had become close to President Boris Yeltsin, and had moved into an apartment inside the Kremlin at the invitation of the Yeltsin family.

In 1999, the 33-year-old Abramovich was elected governor of the Russian province of Chukotka. He ran for a second term as governor in 2005. The Kremlin press service reported that Abramovich's name had been sent for approval as governor for another term to Chukotka's local parliament, which confirmed his appointment on 21 October 2005.

Vladimir Putin
Abramovich was the first person to recommend to Yeltsin that Vladimir Putin be his successor as the Russian president. When Putin formed his first cabinet as Prime Minister in 1999, Abramovich interviewed each of the candidates for cabinet positions before they were approved. Subsequently, Abramovich would remain one of Putin's closest confidants. In 2007, Putin consulted in meetings with Abramovich on the question of who should be his successor as president; Medvedev was personally recommended by Abramovich.

Chris Hutchins, a biographer of Putin, described the relationship between the Russian president and Abramovich as like that between a father and a favourite son. In the early 2000s, Abramovich said that when he addressed Putin he uses the Russian language's formal "вы" (like Spanish "usted" or German "Sie"), as opposed to the informal "ты" (like Spanish "tú" or German "du") as a mark of respect for Putin's seniority. Within the Kremlin, Abramovich was referred to as "Mr A".

In September 2012, the England and Wales High Court judge Elizabeth Gloster claimed that Abramovich's influence on Putin was limited: "There was no evidential basis supporting the contention that Mr Abramovich was in a position to manipulate, or otherwise influence, President Putin, or officers in his administration, to exercise their powers in such a way as to enable Mr Abramovich to achieve his own commercial goals."

Gloster oversaw the case between Russian oligarchs Boris Berezovsky and Abramovich. She found Berezovsky to be "an inherently unreliable witness" and sided with Abramovich in 2012. It later emerged that Gloster's stepson had been paid almost £500,000 to represent Abramovich as a barrister early in the case. Her stepson's involvement was alleged to be more than had been disclosed. Berezovsky stated, "Sometimes I have the impression that Putin himself wrote this judgment". Gloster declined to comment.

U.S. media reports that the U.S. intelligence community believes Abramovich is a "bag carrier", a financial middleman, for Putin.

Sanctions
Abramovich is one of many Russian oligarchs named in the Countering America's Adversaries Through Sanctions Act, CAATSA, signed into law by President Donald Trump in 2017. He is one of the Navalny 35.

Following the Russian invasion of Ukraine in 2022, on March 10, 2022 Abramovich was sanctioned by the UK as part of a group of seven Russian oligarchs. Abramovich had his UK assets frozen and a travel ban was put in place. The British government said the sanctions were in response to Abramovich's alleged ties to the Kremlin and said the companies Abramovich controls could be producing steel used in tanks deployed offensively by Russia in Ukraine. Abramovich denies that he has close ties to Vladimir Putin and the Kremlin.

Also on March 10, Canada imposed sanctions against Abramovich as a businessman helping President Vladimir Putin in his war against Ukraine.

On March 14, Australia and on March 15, the European Union followed Britain's suit and also imposed sanctions on Abramovich.

On March 16, Russian businessman Roman Abramovich, who is accused of having long-standing ties with the Russian president, Vladimir Putin, was added to the Swiss blacklist.

On April 5, 2022 Abramovich came under New Zealand sanctions for close ties with Vladimir Putin.

On October 19, Vladimir Zelenski signed two decrees imposing personal sanctions against 256 Russian businessmen. Among them was Abramovich, being the only person on the list, the restrictions against whom will only work after the exchange of all Ukrainian prisoners and bodies of those killed during the Russian invasion of Ukraine.

In late March 2022, it was reported that Abramovich was house-hunting in Dubai, where his private plane had also been spotted, owing to the city's sanction-free status. In March 2022, The Wall Street Journal reported that the United States administration deferred sanctions on Abramovich at the urging of President of Ukraine Volodymyr Zelensky, because of the oligarch's potential role in negotiations with Russia. The Russian government spokesperson Dmitry Peskov confirmed that Abramovich took part in the negotiations "at the initial stage". No further details of the nature of Abramovich's involvement in the process were disclosed by either party to the conflict.

Alleged poisoning 
On 3 to 4 March 2022, Abramovich attended peace talks on the Ukraine–Belarus border. Abramovich, Ukrainian politician Rustem Umerov and one other negotiator suffered initial symptoms consistent with likely poisoning with an unknown chemical substance, involving "piercing pain in the eyes", inflammation of the eyes and skin with some skin peeling. They all recovered quickly. Bellingcat investigated the allegation and said that chocolate or water that the three had consumed may have been laced with poison; experts took samples of the substance but were unable to identify the type of material used owing to the passage of time. Western sources said the low dosage of poison was aimed to serve as a warning, most likely to Abramovich, and suspected the attack may have been carried out by hardliners in Moscow who tried to sabotage peace talks. An unnamed US official said that the illness was caused by "environmental factors" rather than poisoning. Additionally, an official in the Ukrainian president's office, Ihor Zhovkva, informed the BBC that while he hadn't spoken to Mr Abramovich, participants of the Ukrainian delegation were "fine" and one had said the story was "false". Frank Gardiner of the BBC said the US denial may be caused by a reluctance to respond in a retaliatory manner to Russia by accepting the deployment of chemical weapons in Ukraine. A spokesman for Ukrainian president Volodymyr Zelenskyy said that he had no information about a suspected poisoning.

Controversies

Boris Berezovsky allegations
In 2011, Boris Berezovsky brought a civil case against Abramovich, called Berezovsky v Abramovich, in the High Court of Justice in London, but Berzovsky was unsuccessful in the case. These events are described in greater detail above .

Bribery
In 2008, The Times reported that court papers showed Abramovich admitting that he paid billions of dollars for political favours and protection fees for shares of Russia's oil and aluminium assets.

Allegations of loan fraud
An allegation emerging from a Swiss investigation links Roman Abramovich, through a former company, and numerous other Russian politicians, industrialists and bankers to using a US$4.8 billion (€3.4 billion) loan from the IMF as personal slush fund; an audit sponsored by the IMF itself determined that all of the IMF funds had been used appropriately.

In January 2005, the European Bank for Reconstruction and Development (EBRD) indicated that it would be suing Abramovich over a £9 million (US$14.9 million/€10.6 million) loan. The EBRD said that it is owed US$17.5 million (€12.45 million/£10.6 million) by Runicom, a Switzerland-based oil trading business which had been controlled by Abramovich and Eugene Shvidler. Abramovich's spokesman indicated that the loan had previously been repaid.

Antitrust law violation in Russia
Russia's antitrust body, the Federal Antimonopoly Service, claimed that Evraz Holding, owned in part by Abramovich, had breached Russian competition law by offering unfavourable terms for contractors and discriminating against domestic consumers for coking coal, a key material used in steel production.

Dispute with Kolomoyskyi
According to Putin, Abramovich has been cheated by Ukrainian-Cypriot-Israeli oligarch Igor Kolomoyskyi. Putin claimed in 2014 that Kolomoyskyi had reneged on a contract with Abramovich, saying that the pair signed a multibillion-dollar deal on which Kolomoyskyi never delivered.

Pollution and climate change
According to The Guardian, in 2015 his $766m stake in Evraz, the steel and mining company, gave him ownership of about a quarter of Russia's largest coal mine, the Raspadskaya coal complex in Siberia, whose reserves represented 1.5GT of carbon emissions, comparable to the annual output of Russia itself.

According to The Conversation, "Roman Abramovich, who made most of his $19 billion fortune trading oil and gas, was the biggest polluter on our list" of most polluting billionaires, estimating "that he was responsible for at least 33,859 metric tons of CO2 emissions in 2018 – more than two-thirds from his yacht."

Funding of Israeli settlements
An investigation by BBC News Arabic has found that Abramovich controls companies that have donated $100 million to an Israeli settler organisation Elad, which aims to strengthen the Jewish connection to the annexed East Jerusalem, and renew the Jewish community in the City of David. Analysis of bank documents indicate Abramovich is the largest single donor to the organisation. The bank documents - known as the FinCEN Files - were leaked to BuzzFeed News, then shared with the International Consortium of Investigative Journalists (ICIJ) and the BBC.

Personal life

Marriages and children
Abramovich has been married and divorced three times. In December 1987, following a brief stint in the Soviet Army, he married Olga Yurevna Lysova; they divorced in 1990. In October 1991, he married a former Russian Aeroflot stewardess, Irina Malandina. They have five children; Ilya, Arina, Sofia, Arkadiy and Anna. His eldest daughter Anna is a graduate of Columbia University and lives in New York City, and his daughter Sofia is a professional equestrian who lives in London after graduating from Royal Holloway, University of London.

On 15 October 2006, the News of the World reported that Irina had hired two top UK divorce lawyers, following reports of Abramovich's close relationship with the then 25-year-old Dasha Zhukova, daughter of a prominent Russian oligarch, Alexander Zhukov. The Abramoviches replied that neither had consulted attorneys at that point. However, they later divorced in Russia in March 2007, with a reported settlement of US$300 million (€213 million). Abramovich married Zhukova in 2008, and they have two children, a son, Aaron Alexander, and a daughter, Leah Lou. In August 2017, the couple announced that they would separate; and their divorce was finalised in 2018.

Citizenships and residency
In May 2018, Abramovich became an Israeli citizen a month after the UK delayed renewing his visa. Following the poisoning of Sergei and Yulia Skripal, British authorities delayed the renewal of his visa, as tensions rose between the UK and Russia. Abramovich had been travelling in and out of the UK for years on a Tier-1 investor visa, designed for wealthy foreigners who invest at least £2 million in Britain. Abramovich, who is Russian Jewish, exercised his right under Israel's Law of Return, which states that Jews from anywhere in the world can become citizens of Israel. As an Israeli, Abramovich can now visit Britain visa-free but is not permitted to work or conduct business transactions.

Abramovich owns the Varsano boutique hotel in the Neve Tzedek neighborhood of Tel Aviv, Israel, which he bought for 100 million NIS in 2015 from Israeli actress and model Gal Gadot's husband Yaron Varsano and Varsano's brother Guy. In January 2020, Abramovich purchased a property in Herzliya Pituah, Israel, for a record 226 million NIS.

In 2015, Abramovich donated approximately $30m to Tel Aviv University to establish an innovative Center for Nanoscience and Nanotechnology, which aspires to become one of the leading facilities in the Middle East. Among Abramovich's other beneficiaries is the Sheba Medical Center in Tel HaShomer, Israel, to which he has donated in excess of $60m for various advanced medicine ventures. These include the establishment of a new nuclear medicine center spanning 2,000 sq.m., the Sheba Cancer and Cancer Research centers, the Pediatric Middle East Congenital Heart Center and the Sheba Heart Center. A donation that Abramovich made to Keren Kayemet LeIsrael-Jewish National Fund (KKL-JNF) for a comprehensive forest rehabilitation program in the southern Negev desert, helps to combat the area's rising desertification and promotes increasing nature tourism to the area. Alongside his philanthropic activity, Abramovich has invested some $120m. in 20 Israeli start-ups ranging from medicine and renewable energy, to social media.

Recently, due to the alarming increase in COVID-19 cases in Israel, Abramovich gave Sheba Hospital another donation for a new subterranean Intensive Care Unit, spanning 5,400 sq.m., to provide Israel with vital crisis response in times of national emergencies. Abramovich continuously contributes to Jewish art and culture initiatives, such as the M.ART contemporary culture festival in Tel Aviv, Israel. Abramovich filed an application for a residence permit in the canton of Valais in July 2016, a tax-friendly home to successful businessmen, and planned to transfer his tax residency to the Swiss municipality. Valais authorities readily agreed to the request and transferred the application to the Swiss State Secretariat for Migration for approval. Once there, FedPol investigators expressed suspicions and opposed the request. As a result, Abramovich withdrew his application in June 2017. After a three-year legal saga, in 2021 Swiss authorities cleared Abramovich of any suspicion.

In April 2021, Abramovich became a Portuguese citizen as part of the country's Nationality Act; his genealogy was vetted by experts who look for "evidence of interest in Sephardic [Jewish] culture". Though Reuters noted that there is little known history of Sephardi Jews in Russia, Abramovich had donated money to projects honouring the legacy of Portuguese Sephardic Jews in Hamburg, Germany. However, on 11 March 2022, the leader of the Jewish Community in Porto, Rabbi Daniel Litvak, was arrested by Portuguese police at Porto airport amid allegations that certification of Sephardi Jewish origin had been issued corruptly in several cases.

Wealth
According to Forbes, as of March 2016, Abramovich had a net worth of 7.6 billion, ranking him as the 155th richest person in the world. Prior to the 2008 financial crisis, he was considered to be the second richest person living within the United Kingdom. Early in 2009, The Times estimated that due to the global economic crisis he had lost £3 billion from his £11.7 billion wealth. In the summer of 2020, Abramovich sold the gold miner Highland Gold to Vladislav Sviblov. On 5 March 2021, Forbes listed his net worth at US$14.5 billion, ranking him 113 on the Billionaires 2020 Forbes list.

Wealth rankings

Charitable donations
Abramovich has reportedly donated more money to charity than any other living Russian. Between 2009 and 2013, Abramovich donated more than 2.5 billion to build schools, hospitals and infrastructure in Chukotka. Abramovich has reportedly spent approximately 1.5 bn on the Pole of Hope, his charity set up to help those in the Arctic region of Chukotka, where he was governor. In addition, Evraz Plc (EVR), the steelmaker partly owned by Abramovich, donated 164 million for social projects between 2010 through 2012, an amount that is excluded in Abramovich's 310 million donations during this period.

Abramovich was recognized by the Forum for Jewish Culture and Religion for his contribution of more than $500 million to Jewish causes in Russia, the US, Britain, Portugal, Lithuania, Israel and elsewhere over the past 20 years. In June 2019, Abramovich donated $5 million to the Jewish Agency for Israel, to support efforts to combat anti-Semitism globally.

Abramovich decided to establish a forest of some 25,000 trees, in memory of Lithuania's Jews who perished in the Holocaust, plus a virtual memorial and tribute to Lithuanian Jewry. He also gave a substantial donation for the rehabilitation of the Jewish cemetery of Altona, now a neighborhood in the city of Hamburg. The project is carried out by B'nai B'rith International Portugal in partnership with Hamburg's Chabad. Abramovich donates money to the Chabad movement and along with Michael Kadoorie and Jacob Safra, is one of the main benefactors of the Portuguese Jewish community and of B'nai B'rith International Portugal.

Abramovich funds an extended programme in Israel that brings Jewish and Arab children together in football coaching sessions. More than 1,000 Arab and Jewish children each year will be brought together through football, with Chelsea funding the expanded set-up and club staff training local coaches. The expanded Playing Fair, Leading Peace programme will break down barriers and combat discrimination by mixing communities in Israel. In 2020, during the COVID-19 pandemic, Abramovich paid for NHS staff to stay at the Stamford Bridge Millennium Hotel.

Opposition to anti-semitism and hatred
During Abramovich's ownership of the club, Chelsea agreed to a three-year partnership with the Anti-Defamation League to expand their Center on Extremism. Abramovich faced antisemitic messages during the 2021 Israel–Palestine crisis.

Kick It Out chief executive Tony Burnett hailed Chelsea's stance on fighting anti-Semitism, pledging the anti-discrimination organisation will now look to follow the lead of the club. "Historically it's been alleged that Kick It Out was formed to fight racism against black players and coaches. We looked at our strategy and realised we weren't doing enough on anti-Semitism and we brought together a group of stakeholders with vast experience in this area."

The Chelsea Foundation has launched a new program in partnership with the Peres Center for Peace and Innovation and the Israeli Football Association, introducing football sessions for Arab and Jewish children across Israel, a partnership that was developed following Chelsea Women's visit to Israel in 2019, during which the team took part in football and education workshops with Arab and Jewish girls, benefiting 1,000 children in the first year alone.

Properties
In 2009, he bought 16 Kensington Palace Gardens in London, a 15-bedroom mansion, for £90 million.

For $74 million, Abramovich purchased four Upper East Side townhouses in Manhattan in New York City; 9, 11, 13, and 15 East 75th Street. These townhouses are planned to be combined into a megamansion that will measure 19,400 square feet, and it is estimated that renovation costs will be an additional $100 million.

Car Collection 
Abramovich is a prolific collector of rare and expensive automobiles, and is a VIP client at both Bugatti and Pagani. The majority of his car collection is stored in Lausanne, Switzerland and is valued in excess of $45 million.

The collection includes:

 Pagani Zonda R
 Pagani Huayra BC
 Pagani Imola (#4 of 5)
 Lamborghini Reventón
 Maserati MC12
 Aston Martin Vulcan
 Ferrari FXX-K #72
 Bugatti Veyron 16.4 
 Bugatti Veyron 16.4 Sang Noir
 Bugatti Chiron
 Bugatti Chiron Sport
 Bugatti Divo
 Mercedes-Benz CLK GTR Straßenversion

Yachts
Abramovich has become the world's greatest spender on luxury yachts, and always maintains a fleet of yachts which the media have called "Abramovich's Navy":

Current boats
 Eclipse  – Built in Germany by Blohm + Voss, she was launched in September 2009. Abramovich was due to take delivery of the yacht in December 2009, but was delayed for almost a year after extensive sea trials. The yacht's interior and exterior were designed by Terence Disdale. Eclipse is believed to have cost Abramovich around US$400 million and was the world's largest privately owned yacht until it was eclipsed in 2013 by the  Azzam. The specification includes at least two swimming pools, a cinema, two helicopter landing-pads, several on-board tenders and a submarine that can be launched and dive to a depth of 160 ft. She is also equipped with armour plating surrounding the bridge and Abramovich's master suite, as well as bullet proof windows.
 Solaris
 A 2022 Financial Times report linked Abramovich to the 67-meter yacht Garçon, which is moored in Antigua.

Former boats
 Pelorus  – Built by Lurssen for Sheikh Abdul Mohsen Abdulmalik Al-Sheikh in 2003, original owner of M/Y Coral Island and M/Y Sussurro, who received six offers to sell her before she was even completed. The Sheikh accepted the highest bid which was Abramovich. The interior was designed by Terence Disdale. The exterior was designed by Tim Heywood. Pelorus was refitted by Blohm + Voss in 2005 adding a new forward helipad and zero speed stabilizers. Given to Irina in 2009 as part of the divorce settlement; she was approached on David Geffen's behalf by broker Merle Wood, with Geffen paying US$300 million to take ownership in 2011.
 Sussurro  – Built by Feadship in 1998 for Sheikh Abdul Mohsen Abdulmalik Al-Sheikh.
 Ecstasea  – Largest Feadship built at launch in 2004 for Abramovich. She has a gas turbine alongside the conventional diesels which gives her high cruising speed. Abramovich sold the boat to the Al Nayhan family in 2009.
 Le Grand Bleu  – Formerly owned by John McCaw; Abramovich bought the expedition yacht in 2003 and had her completely refitted by Blohm + Voss, including a  swim platform and sports dock. He presented her as a gift to his associate and friend Eugene Shvidler in June 2006.
 Luna  – Built by Lloyd Werft and delivered to Roman Abramovich in 2009 as an upgraded replacement for his Le Grand Bleu expedition yacht. Sold to close friend, Azerbaijani-born billionaire Farkhad Akhmedov, in April 2014 for US$360m. Boasts a 1 million litre fuel tank, 7 engines outputting 15,000 hp propelling Luna to a maximum speed of 25 knots, 8 tenders, 15 cm ice-class steel hull and 10 VIP Cabins.

Aircraft

Abramovich owns a private Boeing 767-33A/ER, registered in Aruba as P4-MES. It is known as The Bandit due to its livery. Originally the aircraft was ordered by Hawaiian Airlines but the order was cancelled and Abramovich bought it from Boeing. Abramovich had it refitted it to his own requirements by Andrew Winch, who designed the interior and exterior. The aircraft was estimated in 2016 to cost 300 million and its interior is reported to include a 30-seat dining room, a boardroom, master bedrooms, luxury bathrooms with showers, and a spacious living room. The aircraft has the same air missile avoidance system as Air Force One. In 2021 Abramovich exchanged the Boeing 767 for a Boeing 787-8 Dreamliner.

Other interests and activities

Art

Abramovich sponsored an exhibition of photographs of Uzbekistan by renowned Soviet photographer Max Penson (1893–1959) which opened on 29 November 2006 at the Gilbert Collection at Somerset House in London. He previously funded the exhibition "Quiet Resistance: Russian Pictorial Photography 1900s–1930s" at the same gallery in 2005. Both exhibits were organized by the Moscow House of Photography.

In May 2008, Abramovich emerged as a major buyer in the international art auction market. He purchased Francis Bacon's Triptych 1976 for €61.4 million (US$86.3 million) (a record price for a post-war work of art) and Lucian Freud's Benefits Supervisor Sleeping for €23.9 million (US$33.6 million) (a record price for a work by a living artist).

His former wife Dasha Zhukova manages the Garage Center for Contemporary Culture – a gallery of contemporary art in Moscow that was initially housed in the historical Bakhmetevsky Bus Garage building by Konstantin Melnikov. The building, neglected for decades and partially taken apart by previous tenants, was restored in 2007–2008 and reopened to the public in September 2008. Speed and expense of restoration is credited to sponsorship by Abramovich.

New Year's Eve celebrations
In 2011, Abramovich hired the Red Hot Chili Peppers to perform at his estate in Baie de Gouverneur in St. Barth. The performance included a special appearance from Toots Hibbert. He reportedly spent £5 million on 300 guests, including George Lucas, Martha Stewart, Marc Jacobs, and Jimmy Buffett. In 2014, he hired English singer Robbie Williams to headline a New Year's dinner for Vladimir Putin's "inner circle". The party took place in Moscow and appears to have been the inspiration for Williams' song "Party Like a Russian".

See also

List of Jews in sports (non-players)
 List of Russian billionaires
 Russian oligarchs
 List of people and organizations sanctioned during the Russo-Ukrainian War
 List of Jews born in the Russian Empire and the Soviet Union

References

Citations

Sources

Further reading

External links

 Abramovich's profile and assets on Russian Asset Tracker
 Forbes: Roman Abramovich
 Roman Abramovich: Not Your Everyday Owner (Bleacher Report, 2010)
 Pravda: Chelsea's owner Roman Abramovich tops Russia's richest men list (2005)
 BBC Profile: Roman Abramovich (31 August 2012)
 The Main People in the Russian Art (2010)

 
 

 
1966 births
Living people
Russian football chairmen and investors
Chelsea F.C. chairmen and investors
Governors of Chukotka Autonomous Okrug
Jewish Russian politicians
Third convocation members of the State Duma (Russian Federation)
Politicians from Saratov
Abramovich family
Russian billionaires
Russian expatriates in Israel
Russian businesspeople in the oil industry
Russian chief executives
Russian emigrants to Israel
Russian investors
Russian Jews
Israeli Jews
Israeli investors
Israeli billionaires
Israeli businesspeople
Israeli chief executives
Portuguese billionaires
Portuguese expatriates in Israel
Portuguese businesspeople
Portuguese chief executives
Portuguese emigrants to Israel
Portuguese Jews
Yukos
Recipients of the Order of Honour (Russia)
Naturalized citizens of Israel
Naturalised citizens of Portugal
Russian businesspeople in the United Kingdom
Russian businesspeople in Israel
Israeli expatriates in the United Kingdom
Portuguese expatriates in the United Kingdom
People named in the Paradise Papers
Kutafin Moscow State Law University alumni
Russian oligarchs
Russian individuals subject to United Kingdom sanctions
Russian individuals subject to European Union sanctions